Duncan McDougall (born 14 March 1959) is a British rower who competed in the 1980 and 1984 Summer Olympics.

He was born in Aylesbury in 1959. He is a member of the Leander Club.

In 1980 he was a crew member of the British boat which won the silver medal in the eights event. Four years later he finished fifth with the British boat in the 1984 eights competition.

References

1959 births
Living people
English male rowers
British male rowers
Olympic rowers of Great Britain
Rowers at the 1980 Summer Olympics
Rowers at the 1984 Summer Olympics
Olympic silver medallists for Great Britain
Olympic medalists in rowing
Medalists at the 1980 Summer Olympics